Phoebis avellaneda, the red-splashed sulphur, is a large, striking yellow butterfly in the family Pieridae. It is an endemic species found only in Cuba.

P. avellanada was named to honour the Cuban writer Gertrudis Gómez de Avellaneda. The insect is rare in collections. The butterfly is depicted on two Cuban postage stamps; issues of 1982 20c and 1984 1c.

External links
Butterflies of the Americas

Coliadinae
Butterflies of Cuba
Endemic fauna of Cuba
Taxa named by Gottlieb August Wilhelm Herrich-Schäffer
Butterflies described in 1865